The Storylines Tom Fitzgibbon Award is a New Zealand award for writers of children's literature. The award is open only to previously unpublished writers for an original work of fiction intended for children  between 7 and 13 years of age. It is given annually, when merited, to the author in partnership with Scholastic NZ.

About 
The Tom Fitzgibbon Award (officially known as the Storylines Tom Fitzgibbon Award) is a New Zealand literature award for previously unpublished writers who have written a manuscript for children aged between 7 and 13 years of age. The award comes with a cash prize, and the offer of publication (through Scholastic NZ).

Eligibility  
To be eligible for the award, the entrant cannot have had any work of fiction published in print or digital format (provisos exist for small-run self-published works, and smaller pieces in magazines and journals).

Winners

References

New Zealand children's literary awards